, was a Japanese seinen manga anthology published by Shueisha under the Jump line of magazines. The manga of Business Jump were published under the "Young Jump Comics" line. This magazine's mascot was an anthropomorphic, Western-style mouse illustrated by Susumu Matsushita.

History
The magazine debuted in July 1985 as the first "salaryman" magazine to be published by Shueisha, Inc. Business Jump completing with Ultra Jump, Super Jump, etc. was one of its kind in the Jump family of manga magazines. Business Jump readers were typically young, twentysomething business men. BJ was originally a monthly publication, the date of its release was changed to the first Wednesday of every month. For the second time, it was changed in 2008 to the 15th.

The magazine was discontinued in late 2011, with a final double issue, numbered 21/22, released on October 5. Several ongoing series were folded into a new publication, Grand Jump.

Serializations

Current series

Past series

Circulation

References

External links
 

1985 establishments in Japan
2011 establishments in Japan
Defunct magazines published in Japan
Magazines established in 1985
Magazines disestablished in 2011
Magazines published in Tokyo
Monthly manga magazines published in Japan
Seinen manga magazines
Shueisha magazines